Phoenicites is a genus of fossil flowering plants belonging to the Angiospermae.

Fossil record
These fossils have been found in the Miocene of Switzerland, Oligocene of Germany and in the Cretaceous of United States (Age range: 70.6 to 5.332 Ma).

Bibliography
 Fossilium Catalogus. II. Plantae. Pars 54
 A. T. Brongniart. 1828. Prodrome d'une histoire des végétaux fossiles.
 Edward Wilber Berry The Middle and Upper Eocene Floras of Southeastern North America
 Robert W. Read and Leo J. Hickey A Revised Classification of Fossil Palm and Palm-like Leaves Vol. 21, No. 1 (Feb., 1972), pp. 129–137 - International Association for Plant Taxonomy (IAPT) - DOI: 10.2307/1219237
 Emanuil Palamarev, Goran Kitanov, Krassimira Staneva, Vladimir Bozukov  Fossil flora from Paleogene sediments in the northern area of the Mesta Graben in the Western Rhodopes. II. Analysis and stratigraphic importance of the flora

References

Prehistoric angiosperm genera
Arecaceae
Arecaceae genera